Telemark County Municipality was the regional governing administration of the old Telemark county in Norway. The county municipality was established in its current form on 1 January 1976 when the law was changed to allow elected county councils in Norway. The county municipality was dissolved on 1 January 2020, when Telemark was merged with the neighboring Vestfold county, creating the new Vestfold og Telemark county which is led by the Vestfold og Telemark County Municipality. 

The main responsibilities of the county municipality included the running of 29 upper secondary schools. It administered the county roadways, public transport, dental care, culture, and cultural heritage in the county. The administration was located in Skien.

County government
The Telemark county council is made up of 35 representatives that were elected every four years. The council essentially acted as a Parliament or legislative body for the county and it met several times each year. The council is divided into standing committees and an executive board which meet considerably more often. Both the council and executive board are led by the County Mayor who held the executive powers of the county. From 2017 until its dissolution in 2020, Gunn Marit Helgesen of the Conservative Party was the county mayor.

County council
The party breakdown of the council is as follows:

Upper Secondary Schools
The county government ran these schools:
Bamble Upper Secondary School
Bø vidaregåande skule
Croftholmen Upper Secondary School
Hjalmar Johansen Upper Secondary School
Kragerø Upper Secondary School
Lunde vidaregåande skule
Notodden Upper Secondary School
Porsgrunn Upper Secondary School
Rjukan Upper Secondary School
Skien Upper Secondary School
Skogmo Upper Secondary School
Søve Upper Secondary School
Vest-Telemark Upper Secondary School

References

 
Telemark
County municipalities of Norway
1837 establishments in Norway
2020 disestablishments in Norway